Michel Nastorg (1914–1984) was a French actor.

During World War II he was called into the French army as Soldier Second Class. With the Seventh Army he retreated from Belgium before a fierce German onslaught, and found himself at Dunkirk in June 1940.  On 1 June he and other French soldiers embarked on the Scotia which was almost immediately sunk by a German Stuka.  Nastorg was rescued by a British destroyer which discharged him at Dover. He was then returned to France in two weeks time.

Partial filmography

 Gosse de riche (1936)
 Messieurs Ludovic (1946) - Le secrétaire de Le Chartier (uncredited)
 Cyrano de Bergerac (1946) - Le Bret
 Le diamant de cent sous (1948)
 The Lame Devil (1948) - Un laquais (uncredited)
 La Femme nue (1949) - Le peintre
 Toâ (1949) - René
 Folie douce (1951)
 Sans laisser d'adresse (1951) - Un client 
 Sous le ciel de Paris (1951) - Un examinateur (uncredited)
 Sins of Madeleine (1951)
 Une histoire d'amour (1951) - Petit rôle (uncredited)
 La Poison (1951) - Le brigadier 
 Monsieur Leguignon, Signalman (1952) - L'homme qui écoute la radio (uncredited)
 Agence matrimoniale (1952) - Le notaire
 The Nude Dancer (1952) - Michel
 She and Me (1952) - Monsieur Capulet - le père de Colette (uncredited)
 The Virtuous Scoundrel (1953) - Le mécanicien
 Soyez les bienvenus (1953) - Michaud
 Captain Pantoufle (1953) - Le vendeur du 'Garage du centre' (uncredited)
 Mandat d'amener (1953) - Le prêtre
 This Man Is Dangerous (1953) - Govas
 Royal Affairs in Versailles (1954) - Un serviteur (uncredited)
 Adam Is Eve (1954) - Le maître d'hôtel
 Napoléon (1955) - Masséna (uncredited)
 Papa, maman, ma femme et moi (1955) - Me Vandalle - de Cambrai (uncredited)
 Chantage (1955) - Le musicien
 Cherchez la femme (1955)
 Les Aristocrates (1955) - Un visiteur (uncredited)
 Les Mémoires d'un flic (1955) - Un homme de la cour (uncredited)
 La Bande à papa (1956) - Le directeur de la police judiciaire (uncredited)
 Les carottes sont cuites (1956)
 La Peau de l'ours (1957) - Le médecin-légiste
 Donnez-moi ma chance (1957) - Un producteur
 Les Truands (1957) - Le maire
 Rafles sur la ville (1958) - Le directeur de la prison (uncredited)
 Young Sinners (1958) - Le père de Bob
 Marche ou crève (1960) - Meyer
 Colère froide (1960)
 The President (1961) - Un parlementaire
 Un cheval pour deux (1962) - Jean-Pierre
 Un drôle de paroissien (1963)
 Monsieur (1964) - Le docteur
 Les Aventures de Salavin (1964)
 The Gorillas (1964) - (uncredited)
 Circus Angel (1965) - M. de Montsouris
 The Gardener of Argenteuil (1966) - Le voyageur de commerce
 Le Soleil des voyous (1967) - Coulomb (uncredited)
 Le Cinéma de papa (1971) - Le directeur du cinéma (uncredited)

References

External links

1914 births
1984 deaths
French male film actors
20th-century French male actors
French Army personnel of World War II
French Army soldiers